Hadan Holligan (born 16 October 1995) is a Barbadian association footballer who currently plays for Weymouth Wales in the Barbados Premier Division and for the Barbados national team. Holligan also played for Sporting Kristina in 2016, and Hoppers FC in 2017.

Career
After signing for Barbados Premier Division club Weymouth Wales, Holligan was soon called up to the Barbados national team for a friendly against Guyana. The next game - another friendly, against Saint Vincent and the Grenadines he scored his first goal in a 2–2 draw. His next goal came during 2018 World Cup qualifying in a second round, second leg win over Aruba. However, a prior yellow card accumulation meant he should not have been in that match at all. As a result, Barbados' victory and advancement was overturned.

International goals
Scores and results list Barbados' goal tally first.

Notes

References

External links
 
 

1996 births
Living people
Barbadian footballers
Barbados international footballers
Association football midfielders
Weymouth Wales FC players
Notre Dame SC players